Richard Max Ritter (November 7, 1886 – May 24, 1974) was a German freestyle and backstroke swimmer who competed in the 1908 Summer Olympics and in the 1912 Summer Olympics.

Biography
He was born in Magdeburg and died in Montgomery, Pennsylvania.

In 1908 he was eliminated in the semi-finals of the 100 metre backstroke competition.

Four years later at the 1912 Olympics he was eliminated in the quarter-finals of the 100 metre freestyle event. In the 400 metre freestyle competition he won his heat in the first round and advance to the next round but he did not start in his semi-final heat. He was also a member of the German relay team which finished fourth in the 4x200 metre freestyle relay event.

See also
 List of members of the International Swimming Hall of Fame

References

External links
profile

1886 births
1974 deaths
Sportspeople from Magdeburg
German male swimmers
Male backstroke swimmers
German male freestyle swimmers
Olympic swimmers of Germany
Swimmers at the 1908 Summer Olympics
Swimmers at the 1912 Summer Olympics
Presidents of FINA